Azizur Rahman (15 August 1948 – 1 May 2018) Politician of Rajshahi District of Bangladesh and former member of Parliament for Rajshahi-5 constituency in 1991 and 15 February 1996.

Birth and early life 
Azizur was born on 15 August 1948 in Rajshahi district.

Career 
Azizur was an advisor to the Rajshahi district BNP and a member of the national executive committee. He is the former president of Rajshahi district BNP. He was elected Member of Parliament from Rajshahi-5 constituency on the nomination of Bangladesh Nationalist Party in the 5th Parliamentary Election of 1991 and 6th Parliamentary Election of 15 February 1996.

He was defeated from Rajshahi-5 constituency as a candidate of Bangladesh Nationalist Party in elections of 2008.

Death 
Azizur Rahman died on 1 May 2018.

References 

Bangladesh Nationalist Party politicians
5th Jatiya Sangsad members
6th Jatiya Sangsad members
1948 births
2018 deaths
People from Rajshahi District